Lyubsha was an air base in Ukraine located 32 km north of Kalush.  It was located south of Lviv near the Polish-Slovak border.  It appeared to be a forward staging base.  One poorly maintained and small parallel taxiway, and a small ramp were located on the airfield.

History
In the 1970s, aviators of the 179th Fighter Aviation Regiment practiced landing Sukhoi Su-9's at the advanced deployment airfield in Lubsha.

References

Soviet Air Force bases
Ukrainian airbases